Tânia Couto (born 5 July 1972) is a Portuguese former professional tennis player.

Couto won Portugal's national singles championships in 1989 and was also a seven-time national doubles champion. 

On the professional tour, Couto reached a best singles ranking of 345 and featured in the main draw of the 1990 Estoril Open. As a member of Portugal's Federation Cup team in 1991 and 1992 she registered wins in three singles and four doubles rubbers.

Couto's younger brother Emanuel played on the ATP Tour.

Since retiring from tennis she has commentated on the sport for Portuguese television and plays padel competitively.

ITF finals

Singles: 1 (0–1)

Doubles: 2 (1–1)

References

External links
 
 
 

1972 births
Living people
Portuguese female tennis players
20th-century Portuguese women